The International Latin American Dance Championships were created after the Second World War in England by Elsa Wells, and are now organised by Dance News special events. The current full title is the Elsa Wells International Dance Championships, and includes all categories in Standard and Latin American ballroom dance.

The series of Latin American International Championships were started once the initial choreography, teaching and adjudications standards for these dances were stabilised. This occurred in the 1950s, after a period of debate and discussion initiated by Monsieur Pierre and his associates. Although English in origin and organisation, the championships were open to the world, as is the case today for all the major ballroom championships held in England. There are two main series, one for professionals, and another for amateurs, plus various age-limited categories. The division between amateur and professional has persisted in ballroom dance long after it disappeared in most other sports and pastimes.

The final stages for both Amateur and Professional Standard and Latin American titles are always held at the Albert Hall in London. Qualification for these final stages, and the championships for other categories (Juvenile, Under 14, Junior, Under 21, Senior, Pro Rising Stars) are held at a preliminary two-day event before the main finals at Brentwood, Essex. Non-English adjudicators are always included in the adjudication panels. It is one of the largest regular, and genuinely international, events in the ballroom dance world.

This list (and competition) is not the same as the later WDC World Championships. The International Professional Latin and Standard Championships are now part of the World Dance Council's World Super Series.

The dances 
The Latin American competition comprises five dances: cha-cha-cha, samba, rumba, paso doble, and jive, conducted in line with British Dance Council (BDC) regulations; the basis of the dances is described in standard texts. Advanced choreography has, however, broken through the traditional limitations of social dancing, and more obviously in the Latin and American dances than in ballroom (Modern or Standard).

Adjudication 
The qualifying and lesser events days at Brentwood had, in 2009, three adjudication panels of eight former champions and other significant professionals. Early rounds had one panel of eight, alternating. Semi-finals and finals of lesser events had both panels. At the Albert Hall, there were four panels, each of 19 adjudicators. The semi-finals and finals of the amateur and professional titles were each adjudicated by a separate panel. This may be contrasted favourably with the number of judges used for those Olympic Games events which depend upon adjudication, such as ice dancing and diving. Results and adjudication details (marks for each finalist by each adjudicator) are posted after the event.

2009 entrants 
In the Professional Championship there were 150 couples from 34 countries of affiliation (countries of origin not listed). In the Amateur Championship there were 289 couples from 31 countries of affiliation. Countries such as China, Japan, Russia and Italy sent multiple entries to all competitions. The countries listed in the table below are countries of origin, where known.

International Professional Champions

International Amateur Champions

References 

Ballroom dance competitions
Ballroom dance
Lists of award winners